Jaseel P. Ismail (born 16 September 1972) is a former badminton player from Kozhikode city of Kerala, India. He, arguably, is one of India's finest ever doubles players.

Career
During his long career, Jaseel won five doubles titles at Indian National Badminton Championships, partnering George Thomas, Vijaydeep Singh, and Vincent Lobo. He also won two National mixed-doubles titles with Manjusha Kanwar as partner. Jaseel, partnering V. Diju, won the doubles title at Indian Asian Satellite 2004 held at Hyderabad. In the final the pair beat Rupesh Kumar and Sanave Thomas 15-9, 15-1. In the same year, Jaseel and Diju pair also reached the semifinals at Cheers Asian Satellite, Singapore. They upset second seeds Kovit Phisetsarasai and Nitipong Saengsila of Thailand in the men's doubles quarterfinals with a score of 15-7, 15-8. In the semifinal they went down to third-seeded Lin Woon Fui and Mohd Fairuzizuan Mohd Tazari of Malaysia.

Achievements

South Asian Games

IBF International

References

External links
BWF Player Profile

1972 births
Living people
Indian Muslims
Indian male badminton players
Indian national badminton champions
Malayali people
Commonwealth Games medallists in badminton
Commonwealth Games silver medallists for India
Badminton players at the 1998 Commonwealth Games
Racket sportspeople from Kozhikode
South Asian Games gold medalists for India
South Asian Games silver medalists for India
South Asian Games medalists in badminton
Medallists at the 1998 Commonwealth Games